Elifaz is a kibbutz in the Arava valley, near Eilat, in the far south of Israel. It is under the jurisdiction of the Hevel Eilot Regional Council.

History
Elifaz was founded in January 1983 by a group of Nahal members from Jerusalem, Bat Yam, Haifa and Nahariya. The kibbutz is affiliated with the Kibbutz HaArtzi movement. The name "Elifaz" was inspired by  Eliphaz in the Book of Job (f.e. Job 2:11). In the Negev there are also kibbutzim with the names of the two other "friends" of Job; former Mahane Bildad, since 2001 named Tzukim, and Tzofar.

In 2012 it became the first kibbutz in Israel to accept Druze residents; Haza and Nibal Tafesh were unanimously approved as full-fledged members, making them the first Druze in Israel to join a kibbutz.

In 2014, the solar energy developer Arava Power Company inaugurated six solar fields in the Arava and Negev, generating a total of 36 megawatts of electricity. One of these solar fields is in Kibbutz Elifaz.

See also
Solar energy in Israel

References

External links
Official website 

Kibbutzim
Kibbutz Movement
Nahal settlements
Populated places established in 1983
Populated places in Southern District (Israel)
1983 establishments in Israel